"All Alone on Christmas" is a song written and arranged by Steve Van Zandt, and recorded by Darlene Love with members of both The E Street Band and The Miami Horns. It was originally featured on the soundtrack of Home Alone 2: Lost in New York. It was also released as a 7-inch single and a CD single which included an instrumental version.

The song returned Love's name to the music singles charts, peaking at No. 83 on the U.S. Billboard Hot 100 singles chart and at No. 31 on the official UK Singles Chart.

The third track on the single was a Christmas remix of The Capitols "Cool Jerk" which was also taken from the same film soundtrack. The single was influenced by Phil Spector's Wall of Sound and is recorded in the style of the Spector-produced Love song "Christmas (Baby Please Come Home)," which is referenced in the song. The single featured a promotional photo of Love with the five members of the E Street Band who featured on the track. A promotional video featured Macaulay Culkin "producing" as Love performed the song with The E Street Band and The Miami Horns, and it features clips from Home Alone 2: Lost in New York. The song was also featured in the films Love Actually, The Night Before and in the 2001 Italian film Merry Christmas.

Other versions and covers
During the first year of her run in the Broadway musical Hairspray, Love re-recorded "All Alone on Christmas" using the show's cast and band as backup on the charity recording Broadway's Greatest Gifts: Carols for A Cure Vol. 7.  The song references Love's earlier holiday recording "Christmas (Baby Please Come Home)". 
The song was covered by RuPaul for his 1997 Christmas album entitled Ho, Ho, Ho.
Dream pop band Work Drugs released a cover of the song in late 2016.
Boy Jumps Ship released a cover of the song in December 2016 along with a video that includes re-enacted scenes from Home Alone by members of the band. Proceeds from the song are donated to mental health charity MIND.

Personnel
Musicians
 Darlene Love – lead vocals
 The E Street Band
 Clarence Clemons – tenor sax solo
 Danny Federici –  keyboards
 Garry Tallent – bass guitar
 Steven Van Zandt – guitars
 Patti Scialfa - backing vocals
 Max Weinberg – drums
 The Miami Horns
 Mark Pender – trumpet
 Rick Gazda – trumpet 
 Stan Harrison – tenor sax 
 Richie "La Bamba" Rosenberg – trombone
 Eddie Manion – baritone sax
 Arno Hecht – alto sax
 Pat Thrall – guitars
 Mark Alexander – piano
 Isabella Lento – backing vocals
 Carmela Lento – backing vocals
 Zoë Yanakis – percussion
 Benjamin Newberry – chimes

Production
 Steve Van Zandt – producer, arranger
 Zoë Yanakis – associate producer 
 Ben Fowler – recording and mixing
 Dave McNair and Dan Gellert – additional recording
 Scott Hull – editing at Masterdisk  
 Greg Calbi – mastered at Sterling Sound

References

External links

1992 songs
1992 singles
Arista Records singles
Steven Van Zandt songs
Songs written for films
Songs about New York City
Darlene Love songs
American Christmas songs
Songs about loneliness
Home Alone (franchise)